Stuart Leslie MacLeod (born 10 April 1977) is the guitarist and backup singer of the Australian band, Eskimo Joe. He lives in Fremantle, Western Australia. When he was seven he lived next door to Kavyen Temperley and they have been best friends for years. MacLeod and Temperley attended John Curtin Senior High School together. MacLeod then went on to study Engineering and Commerce at the University of Western Australia. In 1997 MacLeod started jamming with Temperley, who was in a band, Freud's Pillow. MacLeod co-wrote several Freud's Pillow's songs. The pair decided to form a new band and auditioned a few drummers before settling on Joel Quartermain, who was a guitarist in Freud's Pillow, but had mentioned he also played drums. MacLeod and Temperley decided Quartermain was more musical than any other drummer they had auditioned. They then entered the band, Eskimo Joe, into the Australian National Campus Band Competition. The first heat in August 1997 was Eskimo Joe's first performance, they went on to win the state final and then the national competition, the reward being a chance to play at the Livid Festival together with a recording session in Sydney.

MacLeod announced his engagement to his fiancée Gen at the 2005 ARIA Awards and they were married in December 2006.

Equipment
Stuart uses various Fender Telecaster guitars, a black Yamaha AES1500B guitar and has used Fender, Vox, and now currently uses Hiwatt and Badcat amplifiers.

Current Effects Pedals

Boss TU-2 Chromatic Tuner
Ibanez TS-808 Tube Screamer (Analog.Man modified)
Boss GE-7 Graphic Equalizer
Line 6 DL4 Delay Modeler
Boss RV-5 Digital Reverb
Cooper Philosopher Awesomeness pedal (series IV with Gumby mod)

Awards and nominations

APRA Awards
The APRA Awards are presented annually from 1982 by the Australasian Performing Right Association (APRA).

|-
| 2005 
| "From the Sea" (Finlay Beaton, Stuart MacLeod, Joel Quartermain)
| Song of the Year
| 
|-
| 2007 
| "Black Fingernails, Red Wine " (Stuart MacLeod, Joel Quartermain, Kav Temperley)
| Song of the Year
| 
|-
| 2008 
| "New York" (Stuart MacLeod, Joel Quartermain, Kav Temperley)
| Most Played Australian Work
| 
|-
| rowspan="3"|2010  || rowspan="3"|"Foreign Land" (Stuart MacLeod, Joel Quartermain, Steve Parkin, Kavyen Temperley) – Eskimo Joe || Most Played Australian Work || 
|-
| Rock Work of the Year || 
|-
| Song of the Year ||  
|-
| rowspan="2"| 2012 || rowspan="2"| "Love Is a Drug" (Stuart MacLeod, Joel Quartermain, Kav Temperley) || Rock Work of the Year || 
|-
| Song of the Year ||

Vanda & Young Global Songwriting Competition
The Vanda & Young Global Songwriting Competition is an annual competition that "acknowledges great songwriting whilst supporting and raising money for Nordoff-Robbins" and is coordinated by Albert Music and APRA AMCOS. It commenced in 2009.

|-
| 2009
| "Foreign Land" (Kav Temperley, Joel Quartermain and Stuart Macleod)
| Vanda & Young Global Songwriting Competition
| style="background:silver;"| 2nd
|-

References

1977 births
Living people
APRA Award winners
Australian guitarists
Australian musicians
Australian people of English descent
Australian people of Scottish descent
Musicians from Western Australia
People educated at John Curtin College of the Arts
21st-century guitarists
Eskimo Joe members